The Vietnam women's national under-17 football team represents Vietnam in international football competitions at the qualifications of AFC U-16 Women's Championship and final tournaments, as well as any other under-17 women's international football tournaments. It is governed by the Vietnam Football Federation.

Competition history

AFC U-16 Championship Record

AFF U-16 Women's Championship

Players

References

Asian women's national under-17 association football teams
u17
Women's football in Vietnam